Jo-Anne Polak (born 1959) was the general manager of the Ottawa Rough Riders from 1989 to 1991. Upon her appointment, Polak became the first woman executive in the Canadian Football League and the first woman general manager to lead a North American sports team. After leaving the Rough Riders, Polak primarily worked at Hill & Knowlton Canada as their vice president between the 1990s to 2000s. After becoming a general manager for Canada Post in 2008, she was named Vice President of Communications in 2011.

Early life and education
In 1959, Polak was born in St. John's, Newfoundland and Labrador. Her mother was a nurse while her father was a pathologist. Polak was part of a choir while she grew up in Barrie, Ontario.
While Polak was in school, she joined the Progressive Conservative Party of Canada's youth group. Polak attended the University of Waterloo in the environmental studies program.

Career
As an adult, Polak continued to remain with the Progressive Conservatives and worked for Member of Parliament Susan Fish and Phil Gillies. She also was a campaign organizer for John Crosbie in 1983 and Larry Grossman in 1985. During her political career, Polak became an account manager for an Ottawa public relations company in 1984. While in public relations, Polak joined the Ottawa Rough Riders in 1987.

For the Rough Riders, Polak was initially named business manager in December 1988, and became a co-general manager alongside Steve Goldman later that month. As general manager, Polak became the first woman to hold an executive role in the Canadian Football League and the first woman general manager of a North American sports team. During this time period, Polak was the alternate governor for the Rough Riders between 1989 to 1991. She held the position of general manager until stepping down in November 1991. 

After leaving the Rough Riders, Polak was briefly a radio host from 1992 to 1993 before working at Hill & Knowlton Canada as the company's vice president until 2007. Polak went on to work in communications at Canada Post as general manager in 2008 before her promotion to vice president of communications in 2011.

Personal life
Polak is married with two step-children.

References

1959 births
Ottawa Rough Riders general managers
Living people
People from St. John's, Newfoundland and Labrador